Godsent (stylized GODSENT) is a Swedish professional esports organization formed by Markus "pronax" Wallsten. It currently has teams competing in Counter-Strike: Global Offensive, Call Of Duty Mobile, Dota 2, Hearthstone, Rainbow Six: Siege, Apex Legends and League of Legends.

History 
After his departure from the ex-Fnatic line up, pronax set off to create his own team. On 15 August 2016, GODSENT acquired most of the old line up which consisted of pronax, Jesper "JW" Wecksell, Robin "flusha" Rönnquist, Freddy "Krimz" Johansson, this happened by Player trade within the Swedish CS:GO pro-scene, losing both Jonas "Lekr0" Olofsson and Simon "twist" Eliasson to Fnatic and with Mathias "pauf" Köhler stepping back from professional CS:GO. Later on another shuffle between GODSENT and Fnatic took place and the teams traded back Lekr0 and KRiMZ.

GODSENT was upset by Alternate aTTaX in the ELeague Season 2 qualifiers and lost their spot in the league.

On 6 November 2016, the team won the European Minor Championship final against Hellraisers guaranteeing a spot on the offline qualifier for the next CS:GO Major - ELEAGUE Major, Atlanta.

On 21 June 2018, the team announced that they have ceased all operations immediately. GODSENT stated that the decision was made "unanimously by all the parties" involved in the management of the organisation and that shutting down was "the best solution for everyone involved."

In September 2019, GODSENT resumed operations after it merged with The Final Tribe, a Swedish esports organization. Later that year, in November, it acquired SMASH Esports'''s CS:GO roster.

In April 2020, GODSENT acquired two Tom Clancy's Rainbow Six Siege'' rosters.

Rosters

Counter-Strike: Global Offensive

References

Counter-Strike teams
Esports teams based in Sweden
2016 establishments in Sweden
2018 disestablishments in Sweden
Godsent players